Damrau is a surname. Notable people with the surname include:

Diana Damrau (born 1971), German opera singer
Harry Damrau (1890–1957), American baseball player